John Henry Cleary (2 September 1854 – 23 February 1937) was an Australian politician.

He was born on the Tasman Peninsula in Tasmania. In 1916 he was elected to the Tasmanian House of Assembly as a Labor member for Denison. He served until his defeat in 1928. Cleary died in Hobart in 1937.

References

1854 births
1937 deaths
Members of the Tasmanian House of Assembly
Australian Labor Party members of the Parliament of Tasmania